Qazvin Province (Ostān-e Qazvīn) is one of the 31 provinces of Iran. It is in the northwest of the country, with the city of Qazvin as its capital. The province was created in 1993 out of part of Tehran province. At the time of the National Census of 2006, the population of the province was 1,127,734 in 294,305 households. The following census in 2011 counted 1,201,565 inhabitants living in 352,472 households, of whom 68.05% lived in cities and 31.95% in villages. By the time of the most recent census in 2016, the population had risen to 1,273,761 people in 397,165 households. 

The province was made a part of Region 1 upon the division of the provinces into 5 regions solely for coordination and development purposes on June 22, 2014.

Qazvin is home to a wide range of ethnic groups. The city of Qazvin is mostly inhabited by ethnic Persians who speak the Persian language with a Qazvini accent. The south-eastern part of the province is inhabited by Azeris who speak Azerbaijani. The Tats live in the central part of the province, around Takestan and speak Tati. The Kurdish people in Qazvin province are divided into the tribes of Ghiasvand, Kakavand, Maʿāfi, Reshvand, Bājalān, Behtuʾi, Čamišgazak, Jalilvand, and Kalhor.  Finally, the majority of people in the northern part of the province, in Alamut, are Gilaks who speak a dialect of the Gilaki language. However, other sources claim that the majority of people in Alamut likely the ‘Tats’ are Mazanderani.

History

Qazvin was the location of a former capital of the Persian Empire and contains over 2000 architectural and archeological sites. It is a provincial capital today that has been a cultural center of mass throughout history.

Archeological findings in the Qazvin plain reveal the existence of urban agricultural settlements as far back as 7000 BC. The name “Qazvin” or “Kasbin” is derived from Cas, an ancient tribe that lived south of the Caspian Sea millennia ago. The Caspian Sea itself in fact derives its name from the same origin. Qazvin geographically connects Tehran, Isfahan, and the Persian Gulf to the Caspian seacoast and Asia Minor, hence its strategic location throughout the ages.

Qazvin has been a hotbed of historical developments in Iranian history. In the early years of the Islamic era Qazvin served as a base for the Arab forces. Destroyed by Genghis Khan (13th century), the Safavid monarchs made Qazvin the capital of the Safavid empire in 1548 only to have it moved to Isfahan in 1598. During the Qajar Dynasty and contemporary period, Qazvin has always been one of the most important governmental centers due to its proximity to Tehran. Abbas Mirza, a Crown Prince and Minister of Commerce, was also the governor of Qazvin.

Qazvin is situated close to Alamut, where the famous Hasan-i Sabbah, founder of the secret Ismaili order of the Assassins, operated from.

Qazvin is where the coup d'état of General Reza Khan, with his Russian-trained Cossack brigade, was launched from – which led to the founding of the Pahlavi dynasty in 1921.

1962 Buin Zahra earthquake killed 12.225 people.

Geography 

The province covers 15821 km2 between 48–45 to 50–50 east of Greenwich Meridian of longitude and 35–37 to 36–45 north latitude of the equator. The province is bounded on the north by Mazandaran and Gilan, on the west by Hamedan and Zanjan, on the south by Markazi and on the east by Tehran Provinces.

The famous mountains of the province are those of Siälän, Shäh Alborz, Khashchäl, Sephidkouh, Shojä e din, Alehtareh, Rämand, Ägh dägh, Kharaghän, Saridagh, Soltan pïr, and Siähkouh, in which Siälän with a height of 4175m and Shäh Alborz which is 4056m are the highest. All are part of the central chain of Alborz. The lowest point of the province is in Tärom e Soflä.

Climate
The climate of the province in the northern parts is cold and snowy in winters and temperate in summers. In the southern parts the climate is mild with comparatively cold winters and warm summers.

Administrative divisions

Cities 

According to the 2016 census, 952,149 people (nearly 75% of the population of Qazvin province) live in the following cities: Abgarm 6,336, Abyek 60,107, Alvand 93,836, Ardak 5,043, Avaj 5,142, Bidestan 18,060, Buin Zahra 20,823, Danesfahan 9,434, Eqbaliyeh 55,066, Esfarvarin 12,371, Khak-e Ali 3,148, Khorramdasht 6,554, Kuhin 1,411, Mahmudabad Nemuneh 21,982, Moallem Kalayeh 2,223, Mohammadiyeh 90,513, Narjeh 5,604, Qazvin 402,748, Razmian 1,253, Sagzabad 5,492, Shal 15,290, Sharifiyeh 20,347, Sirdan 805, Takestan 80,299, and Ziaabad 8,262.

Main sights

Qazvin contains several archeological excavations dating back 9000 years ago. There are also 23 castles from the Ismaili Assassins nearby as well. And in the middle of the city, there lies the ruins of Meimoon Ghal'eh, one of several Sassanid edifices in the area.

Qazvin contains few buildings from the Safavi era when it was capital of Persia. Perhaps the most famous of the surviving edifices is the Ali Qapu mansion, today a museum in central Qazvin.

Historical mosques
After Islam, the abundant attendance of mystics (ascetics), as well as the prevalence of tradition (Hadith), religious jurisprudence (Fegh´h), and philosophy in Qazvin, led to the emergence of many mosques and religious schools among which the most magnificent ones are:
Jame e Atigh Mosque: One of the oldest mosques in Iran constructed by the orders of Harun al-Rashid in 807AD. In spite of the devastating Mongol invasion, this mosque still stands today in its full glory.
Heidarieh Mosque: Renovated by Amir Khomär-täsh after the earthquake of 1119 AD, the history of construction of this mosque goes back to pre-Islam, where it was a fire temple.
Masjed Al-nabi (Soltani Mosque): With an area of 14000 m2, this mosque is one of the most glorious mosques of antiquity, built in the Safavid period.
Sanjideh Mosque: Another mosque of Qazvin dating back to pre-Islamic Iran; a former fire temple. Its present-day form is attributed to the Seljukian era.
Panjeh Ali Mosque: A former place of worship for royal harem members in the Safavid period.
Peighambarieh School-Mosque: Founded 1644 according to inscription.
Peighambarieh Shrine: Where four Jewish saints who foretold the coming of Christ, are buried.
Molla Verdikhani School-Mosque: founded in 1648.
Salehieh School-Mosque: founded in 1845.
Sheikhol Islam School-Mosque: renovated in 1903.
Eltefatieh School: Dating back to the Il-Khanid period.
Sardar School- Mosque: Made by two brothers Hossein Khan and Hassan Khan Sardar in 1815, as a fulfillment of their promise if they came back victorious from a battle against the Russians.

Churches and Russian architecture
Qazvin contains three buildings built by the Russians in the late 19th/early 20th century. Among these is the current Mayor's office (former Ballet Hall), a water reservoir, and the Cantor church where a Russian pilot is buried.

According to explorers Pietro Della Valle, Jean Baptist Tavenier, Johannes Chardin, and others, there have been many Christians of various sects living in Qazvin for centuries. Qazvin is the location of the Saint Hripsime church, and it is also where four Jewish prophets gave tidings of the arrival of Jesus Christ. Their tomb is now a popular shrine called Peighambariyeh.

Castles and forts
These are castles and fortifications left over mostly from the Isma'ili movement of the Middle Ages:
Alamout Castle
Lambesar Castle
Shirkouh Castle
Qez Qaleh Castle
Shemiran Castle
Meimoon Ghal'eh
Barajin Qaleh

Tombs, shrines and mausoleums

Another grand attraction in Qazvin Province, is the tombs of two Saljuki era princes, Aboo Saeed Bijar son of Sad and Aboo Mansoor Iltai son of Takin, that are located in two separate towers known as the Kharaghan twin towers. Constructed in 1067, these are the first monuments in Islamic Architecture which include a non-conic two-layered dome.

Both towers were severely damaged by a devastating earthquake in March 2003.

Some popular shrines and Mausoleums in Qazvin province are:
Imamzadeh Hossein
Peighambarieh (where 4 Jewish prophets are buried)
Imamzadeh Ismail
Ameneh Khatoon
Zobeideh Khatoon (that has also a unique traditional water reservoir)
Imamzadeh Abazar
Imamzadeh Abdollah and Imamzadeh Fazlollah in Farsajin
Imamzadeh Vali in Ziaabad
Imamzadeh Kamal in Heydarieh
Imamzadeh Ali in Shekarnab
Haft Sandoogh Pilgrimage Place
Tombs of Hassan Abad and Shahkouh
Soltan Veis
Mausoleum of Pir e Takestan
Kafar Gonbad
Hamdollah Mostowfi's Tomb
Imam Ahmad Ghazali's Tomb
Molla Khalila's Tomb
Shahid Sales' Tomb
Raeesol Mojahedin's Tomb

Traditional reservoirs
In the old days, Qazvin was nicknamed the 'city of water reservoirs'. Of the 100 or so water reservoirs of Qazvin, only 10 remain today, all protected by the Provincial Cultural Heritage Organization. See: List of famous ab anbars of Qazvin

Bazaars and caravanserais
Qazvin has some fine examples of centuries old Bazaars and caravanserais:
Sa'd-ol-Saltaneh Complex
Qeisarieh
Saray e Vazir
Saray e Razavi (Shah)
Saray e Hadj Reza
Sadieh Bazaar
Shah Abbasi Caravanserai of Avaj
Shah Abbasi Caravanserai of Mohammad Abad
Hajib Shah Abbasi Caravanserai (Keikhosro)

The traditional gardens of qazvin

Qazvin modern towers

Residential towers like Ponak (536 units), Sky (Aseman, 300 units) 17 levels, Elahieh and Bademestan (440 units) with 17 levels.

Tejarat tower with 28 levels

Qazvin shopping complexes

City Star in Khayam street

Ferdosi in Ferdosi street

Iranian in Adl street

Qazvin hypermarket

Proma Hypermarket

Bridges
 Naderi
 Molasadra
 Ertebatat
 Persian Gulf (Khalij Fars)
 Abotorabi
 Nasr
 Motahari
 Imam Ali
 Rajaei

Famous parks
 Mashahir in Shahrdai Street
 Barajin
 Melat
 Afarinesh

Famous hotels
 Alborz
 Iran
 Marmar
 Ghods
 Noizar

City gates and other edifices
During the 9th century AD seven gates made entrance to the city possible. In Qajar period there existed nine gates surrounding the city which were connected to each other through a wall around the city. These gates (darvāzeh in Persian) were:

Panbeh Riseh
Sheikh Abad
Rasht
Maghlävak
Khandaghbar
Shahzadeh Hossein
Mossala
Tehran
Räh e Koushk

Due to 20th century hasty urban expansion, only the last two gates remain standing. Other popular attractions of Qazvin province include:
Chehel Sotun Museum-Palace
Hosseinieh Aminiha, a fine example of Traditional Persian residential architecture indigenous to Qazvin.
Shah Abbasi Bridge
Safa Traditional Bath
Qajar Traditional Bath

Notable people

Ali Akbar Dehkhoda: Prominent linguist and author of Iran's first modern Persian dictionary, was originally from Qazvin.
Obeid Zakani
Hamdollah Mostowfi: The great Il-Khanid historian and writer (1281–1349) and author of The Selected History (Tarikh Gozideh), Nezhatol Qoloub and Zafar Nameh. The turquoise conic dome and its inscription in Sols calligraphy in which Mostowfi's family tree and his works are introduced are the features that distinguish the tomb from other historical monuments of Qazvin.
Táhirih

Economy

Agriculture

13,000 km2 are under cultivation in the province, covering 12% of the cultivable lands of the country. These are fed by numerous subterranean canals, deep and semi-deep wells, and a large irrigating canal which originates from The Sangbän dam in Taleghän and Ziärän. The agricultural produce of the land is grape, hazelnut, pistachio, almond, walnut, olive, apple, wheat, barley, sugar beet, pomegranate, fig, and cereals. Animal husbandry, and aquatic and poultry breeding are developed throughout the province.

Industries
In recent decades, Qazvin has become a developing pole of the country, primarily due to its preferable location. Qazvin today is a center of textile trade, including cotton, silk and velvet, in addition to leather. It is on the railroad line and the highway between Tehran and Tabriz.

Qazvin has one of the largest power plants feeding electricity into Iran's national power grid, the Shahid Raja'i facility, which provides 7% of the country's electricity.

Colleges and universities
Imam Khomeini International University
 Islamic Azad University of Takestan
 Islamic Azad University of Qazvin
 Qazvin University of Medical Sciences
 Shahid Babaee Technical Institute

See also 
 Dineh Kuh

References

External links
 Qazvin Information Network

 
Provinces of Iran
1993 establishments in Iran